Grant Palmer may refer to:
Grant Palmer (actor) (born 2002), American actor
Grant H. Palmer (1940–2017), American educator
Grant Palmer (bus operator), a British company
Grant Palmer (racing driver) (born 2001), American racing driver